In mathematics, a non-Euclidean crystallographic group, NEC group or N.E.C. group is a discrete group of isometries of the hyperbolic plane. These symmetry groups correspond to the wallpaper groups in euclidean geometry. A NEC group which contains only orientation-preserving elements is called a Fuchsian group, and any non-Fuchsian NEC group has an index 2 Fuchsian subgroup of orientation-preserving elements.

The hyperbolic triangle groups are notable NEC groups. Others are listed in Orbifold notation.

See also
Non-Euclidean geometry
Isometry group
Fuchsian group
Uniform tilings in hyperbolic plane

References
.
.
.

Non-Euclidean geometry
Hyperbolic geometry
Symmetry
Discrete groups